Dysauxes ancilla, the handmaid, is a moth of the family Erebidae. The species was first described by Carl Linnaeus in his 1767 12th edition of Systema Naturae. It lives in southern and central Europe, through Turkey and Armenia, over the Ural Mountains and up to the Caucasus.

The wingspan is 22–25 mm.

The larvae primarily feed on Taraxacum, Senecio, Plantago and Lactuca species.

External links

Fauna Europaea
Lepiforum e. V.

Syntomini
Moths of Europe
Moths of Asia
Moths described in 1767
Taxa named by Carl Linnaeus